John Norman Shade (April 6, 1902 – October 26. 1985) was an American politician and businessman.

Shade was born in Pekin, Illinois and was in the real estate business. He served as mayor of Pekin, Illinois from 1939 to 1954 and from 1959 to 1966. He was a  Republican. Shade served in the Illinois House of Representatives from 1954 to 1958 and from 1966 to 1970. He also served on the Tazewell County Board. Shade died at the Pekin Convalescent Center in Pekin, Illinois.

Notes

External links

1902 births
1985 deaths
People from Pekin, Illinois
Businesspeople from Illinois
County board members in Illinois
Mayors of places in Illinois
Republican Party members of the Illinois House of Representatives
20th-century American politicians
20th-century American businesspeople